This is a list of notable Mexican artisans:

Baskets and other non-textile fibers
 Feo Ariza (straw mosaics)
 Rosalinda Cauich Ramirez (baskets)
 Ángel Gil (ixtle fiber products, Guanajuato)
 Apolinar Hernandez Balcazar (baskets, State of Mexico)
 Fortunato Hernández Bazán (ixtle fiber products, Oaxaca)
 Fortunato Moreno Reinoso (reed and bamboo objects, Michoacan)
 Pineda Palacios family (palm frond nativity scenes, Puebla)
 María Quiñones Carrillo (baskets, Chihuahua)
 Felipa Tzeek Naal (palm frond weaving, Campeche)
 Villajuana family (hammocks, Yucatán)
 Andrés Uc Dzul (Panama hats, Campeche)

Lacquer ware
 Mario Agustín Gaspar (Michaocan)
  Pablo Dolores Regino (Guerrero))
 Francisco Coronel Navarro (Guerrero)

Metal working
 Punzo family (copper crafts) (Michoacán)
 William Spratling (silver, Guerrero)
 Apolinar Aguilar Velasco (steel blades, Oaxaca)

Paper-based crafts
 Linares family (alebrijes and cartonería)(Mexico City)
 Pedro Linares (alebrijes and cartonería, Mexico City)
 Rodolfo Villena Hernández (cartonería, Puebla)
 Hermes Arroyo (cartonería and other media, San Miguel de Allende))
 Sotero Lemus
Adalberto Álvarez Marines

Pottery

 Aguilar family(pottery)
 Josefina Aguilar (Oaxaca)
 Hilario Alejos Madrigal(Michoacan)
 Neftalí Ayungua Suárez (Michoacan)
 Alberto Bautista Gómez (Chiapas)
 Jesús José Berabe Campechano(Jalisco)
 Blanco family(Oaxaca)
 Teodora Blanco Núñez
 María Lilia Calam Que(Campeche)
 Celso Camacho Quiroz (State of Mexico)
 Jesús Carranza Cortés (ceramic figures, Jalisco)
 Alfonso Castillo Orta (Trees of life, Puebla)
 Miguel Chan and Roger Juárez (Yucatán)
 Cayetano Corona Gaspariano(Tlaxcala)
 Margarita Cruz Sipuachi(Chihuahua)
 José García Antonio(Oaxaca)
 Maximo Gómez Ponce(Puebla)
 Adrián Luis González(State of Mexico)
 Gorky González Quiñones(Guanajuato)
 Florentino Jimón Barba(Jalisco)
 Leonarda Estrella Laureano(Sinaloa)
 Carlomagno Pedro Martínez (barro negro, Oaxaca)
 Zenón Martínez García(Jalisco)
 Esther Medina Hernández(Puebla)
 Felipa Hernandez Barragan(Morelos)
 Emilio Molinero Hurtado(Michoacan)
 Rosalinda Cauich Ramirez (Quintana Roo)
 María de Jesús Nolasco Elías(Michoacan)
 Trinidad Núñez Quiñones
 Nicasio Pajarito Gonzalez (Jalisco)
 Ignacio Peralta Soledad (ceramic sculptures, Puebla)
 Juan Quezada Celado(Chihuahua)
 Guillermo Ríos Alcalá(Colima)
 Elena Felipe and Bernadina Rivera(Michoacan)
 Doña Rosa (barro negro, Oaxaca)
 Pedro Ruíz Martínez and Odilia Pineda (Michoacan)
 Ángel Santos Juárez(Jalisco)
 Soteno family of Metepec(State of Mexico)
 Cesar Torres Ramírez (Talvera pottery, Puebla)
 Uriarte Talavera (Talavera ceramics, Puebla)
 Salvador Vázquez Carmona(Jalisco)
 Jorge Wilmot (Jalisco)

Textiles
 Ana Karen Allende (rag dolls, Mexico City)
 Florentina López de Jesús (weaving, Guerrero)
 Pedro Preux (rug making, Mexico City)
 Arnulfo Mendoza
 Original Friends Dolls (cloth dolls, Guadalajara)
Porfirio Gutierrez (weaver)

Wood
 Jacobo Angeles
 Aguirre family (inlaid wood items, Jalisco)
 Manuel Jiménez Ramírez (alebrijes, Oaxaca)
 Alejandro Rangel Hidalgo (furniture, Colima)
 José Reyes Juárez (masks, Tlaxcala)
 Hipolito Vázquez Sánchez (wood carving, Tlaxcala)
 Ascensión de la Cruz Morales (musical instruments, Durango)
 Agustín Parra Echauri(reproduction of colonial era pieces, Jalisco)
 Agustín Cruz Tinoco(Oaxaca)
 Plácido Otilia family(musical instruments, San Luis Potosí)

References

 *
Artists